The International Ice Hockey Federation (IIHF) Women's World Championship is contested annually in non-Olympic years.  The "top division" consists of the nine highest ranked countries.  The event was first contested in 1990.  It became an annual event (except in Olympic years), starting in 1997.  After each event, the IIHF has handed out awards to the top participants.  The awards for Most Valuable Player, Top Defenseman, Top Forward and Top Goaltender have been presented in some combination except after the 1997 tournament.

The IIHF directorate at each tournament is made up of one member from each of the participating member nations.  These members vote on the awards, which are presented after the gold medal game of the tournament.

References

IIHF Women's World Ice Hockey Championships